The  was a political party in Japan formed in 1998 by Ichirō Ozawa and Hirohisa Fujii. It is now defunct, having joined the Democratic Party of Japan in 2003. 

The Liberal Party were part of the Japanese liberal Parties genealogy, neoliberal and neoconservative. Ichirō Ozawa should not be confused with the left-liberal Liberal Party, which was re-established in 2016.

History
The Liberal Party was formed from remnants of the New Frontier Party after it dissolved in 1998. The party did do quite well for a new party, joining the opposition led by the Democratic Party of Japan (DPJ) and also including the New Kōmeitō, the Social Democratic Party and Japanese Communist Party, and thus helped contest elections against the ruling conservative Liberal Democratic Party (LDP).

In January 1999, it formed a coalition with the ruling LDP under Keizō Obuchi. Takeshi Noda as Minister for Home Affairs became its only member in the realigned Obuchi cabinet, later replaced by Toshihiro Nikai as Minister of Transportation. Later that year, the New Kōmeitō joined the coalition as well, and party president Ichirō Ozawa decided to lead the Liberal Party back into the opposition as he saw his party's position endangered. However, some members of the coalition wanted to stay in the government and eventually formed the breakaway New Conservative Party.

In October 2003, because of the upcoming election, the Liberal Party finally merged with the DPJ and all its members joined the new party, making an influential grouping within the party. The DPJ did tremendously well, and Hirohisa Fujii became the Secretary General of the Democratic Party of Japan, while Ichiro Ozawa led the Liberal Party faction within the DPJ. In 2016, the name was revived by Ozawa, on his renaming of the People's Life Party to the Liberal Party.

Presidents of LP

Election results

House of Representatives

House of Councillors

See also
Liberalism
Contributions to liberal theory
Liberalism worldwide
List of liberal parties
Liberal democracy
Liberalism in Japan
Japan New Party
Democratic Party of Japan
Liberal Party (Japan, 2016)

References

Conservative parties in Japan
Liberal parties in Japan
Classical liberal parties
Defunct political parties in Japan
Political parties established in 1998
Political parties disestablished in 2003
1998 establishments in Japan
2003 disestablishments in Japan